Favorite Songs of All is Phillips, Craig and Dean's sixth album and first greatest hits collection. No songs from Where Strength Begins or Repeat the Sounding Joy were included. In addition, two new songs, "Freedom of the Sea" and "No Matter How Long" were added to the album. "Shine On Us" originally appeared on the compilation album My Utmost for His Highest  and appears for the first time on a PC&D album.

Track listing
"Freedom of the Sea" (Dan Dean, Lowell Alexander) – 4:57
"No Matter How Long" (Dan Dean) – 4:53
"Favorite Song of All" – 4:29
"Turn Up the Radio" – 3:52
"I Want to Be Just Like You" – 5:33
"Shine On Us" (Michael W. Smith, Debbie Smith) – 4:03
"Mercy Came Running" – 4:27
"The Concert of the Age" – 4:20
"Midnight Oil" – 4:42
"Build a Bridge of Love" – 4:42
"This Is the Life" – 3:26
"Little Bit of Morning" – 4:24
"He'll Do Whatever It Takes" – 4:56
"Crucified with Christ" – 5:18

Personnel

Musicians
Phillips, Craig and Dean
 Randy Phillips – vocals 
 Shawn Craig – vocals 
 Dan Dean – vocals 

Musicians (Tracks 1 & 2)
 Blair Masters – keyboards, acoustic piano 
 Lincoln Brewster – guitars 
 Jimmie Lee Sloas – bass 
 Chris McHugh – drums 
 Sam Levine – tin whistle (1)
 John Catchings – cello 
 Richard Grosjean – viola 
 David Angell – violin 
 David Davidson – violin, string contractor 
 Paul Mills – arrangements, string conductor 
 Lisa Cochran – backing vocals 
 Tim Davis – backing vocals, vocal arrangements 
 Rikk Kittlemann – backing vocals

Production
 John Mays – executive producer (1, 2)
 Paul Mills – producer (1-5, 7-14), vocal recording (1, 2), mixing (1, 2), vocal production (6)
 Brown Bannister – producer (6)
 Shane D. Wilson – recording (1, 2)
 Jeff Pitzer – string recording (1, 2), musical assistance (1, 2), production manager (1, 2)
 Jason Boertje – musical assistance (1, 2)
 Ronnie Thomas – editing 
 Hank Williams – mastering 
 Christiév Carothers – creative direction 
 Jan Cook – art direction 
 Ian Black – design 
 Matthew Barnes – photography 
 Kristin Gossett Barlowe – stylist 

Studios
 Tracks 1 & 2 recorded at Sixteenth Avenue Sound and Quad Studios (Nashville, Tennessee); RTC Studio (Franklin, Tennessee); Sunset Blvd. Studios (Brentwood, Tennessee).
 Tracks 1 & 2 mixed at Shakin' Studio (Franklin, Tennessee).
 Edited and Mastered at MasterMix (Nashville, Tennessee).

1998 albums
Phillips, Craig and Dean albums